Puerto Rico Highway 173 (PR-173) is a road that travels from Aibonito, Puerto Rico to Guaynabo, passing through Cidra and Aguas Buenas. This highway begins at PR-14 in Plata and ends at PR-1 in Río.

Major intersections

Related route

Puerto Rico Highway 7173 (PR-7173) is a dead end road that branches off from PR-173 in Sumidero.

See also

 List of highways numbered 173

References

External links
 

173